Santa Sylvina is a town in Chaco Province, Argentina. It is the head town of the Fray Justo Santa María del Oro Department. The town was established in 1944.

Festivals
Fiesta Nacional de Caza de la Paloma
Capital Nacional del Gaucho

External links

Populated places in Chaco Province
Populated places established in 1944